Rebeca Linares (born 13 June 1983) is a Spanish pornographic actress and Penthouse Pet. Although born in San Sebastián, Basque Autonomous Community, Spain, she has lived for many years in Barcelona. She chose Rebeca for her stage name because "it's short and very strong" and Linares is her actual last name.

Biography
Linares began appearing in adult movies in 2005 in Spain; her best friend was a friend of Spanish adult star Nacho Vidal. Due to the low volume of work and money in Spain, she began working in other parts of Europe, such as Berlin and France. She moved to Los Angeles in March 2006. Linares said about her move, "I wanted to stay in one place, living and working every day, and here is the whole business."

In 2008, she shot a photo spread for Maxim magazine.

In 2009, Spanish television channel Canal+ made a documentary about her life and career in America entitled Vente a Las Vegas, Nena (Come to Las Vegas, Baby). In January 2010, Linares won an AVN Award, along with Tori Black and Mark Ashley, for their three-way scene from the movie Tori Black Is Pretty Filthy.

Awards
 2007 FICEB Ninfa Award – Best Supporting Actress (Iodine Girl)
 2010 AVN Award – Best Threeway Sex Scene (Tori Black Is Pretty Filthy)

References

External links

 
 
 
 

1983 births
Actresses from the Basque Country (autonomous community)
Living people
Penthouse Pets
People from San Sebastián
Spanish female adult models
Spanish pornographic film actresses